John Charles Rock (March 24, 1890 – December 4, 1984) was an American obstetrician and gynecologist. He is best known for the major role he played in the development of the first birth control pill, colloquially called "the pill".

Early life and career
John Charles Rock was born on March 24, 1890, in Marlborough, Massachusetts, and died on December 4, 1984, in Peterborough, New Hampshire, at the age of 94. He was born into a Roman Catholic family and was one of four children. Rock was a known scientist, obstetrician and gynecologist, but he was also an author who wrote a few books after his discovery of the contraceptive pill. Prior to John Rock's discovery of the first contraceptive method, he did not express an interest in pharmacology. During his early years at the High School of Commerce in Boston, he a desire to pursue a career in business. With an education and experience working on plantations for the United Fruit Company in Guatemala and an engineering firm in Rhode Island, he came to the realization that this career path was not his calling. He became good friends with the company's doctor, Neil MacPhail, who mentored John and allowed him to assist in surgeries at the hospital he managed. After his time in Guatemala, John Rock furthered his education at Harvard University in Cambridge, Massachusetts in 1912 where he received his bachelor's degree in 1915. He then attended and graduated from Harvard University Medical School in 1918. He originally planned to specialize in the nervous disorders, however he decided to change it to obstetrics and gynecology and founded his own medical practice a few years later and retired in 1956. Rock was the founder of the Rock Reproductive Study Center at the Free Hospital for Women in Brookline, Massachusetts and was also a Clinical Professor of Gynecology at Harvard Medical School. He was appointed director of the Sterility Clinic at the Free Hospital for Women and would hold this position for 30 more years. Rock and his wife raised five children.

Rock was a pioneer in in vitro fertilization and sperm freezing. He helped many of his patients achieve pregnancy and became known as a "ground-breaking infertility specialist".

As his career progressed, and despite being a devout Catholic, Rock also became known for his acceptance of birth control. (Birth control was illegal in Massachusetts until the 1965 Supreme Court case Griswold v. Connecticut.) In the 1930s, he founded a clinic to teach the rhythm method, the only birth control conditionally regarded as moral by the Catholic Church at the time. In 1931, Rock was the only Catholic physician to sign a petition to legalize birth control. In the 1940s, he taught at Harvard Medical School—and included birth control methods in his curriculum. Rock also coauthored a birth control guide for the general reader, titled Voluntary Parenthood and published in 1949.

For most of Rock's medical career, he directed and practiced at the Fertility and Endocrine Clinic at the Free Hospital for Women in Boston, Massachusetts. In addition to practicing as a medical doctor, he was an active researcher, striving to discover new knowledge and offer more help to his female patients. In collaboration with Marshall Bartlett, Rock conducted research on the schedule of ovulation and the sequential stages of the endometrium during a woman's menstrual cycle. Rock's research throughout the 1930s to 1950s focused on two large projects that advanced reproductive medicine. Working with Arthur Hertig, Rock identified implantation and the following stages of embryonic development. At this time, no one knew how, where, or when a woman's eggs were fertilized. In another project, with Miriam Menkin as his assistant, they researched human in vitro fertilization. Their study reported in 1944 that eggs fertilized outside the human body had successfully initiated embryonic cleavage for the first time in a lab setting. The report obtained national attention and was dubbed “test-tube fertilization”. This research opened a door of possibilities for future technology to overcome obstacles in reproductive medicine, providing hope to many women experiencing infertility. Although Rock and Menkin's findings were groundbreaking, the research for in vitro fertilization was not advanced and safe enough to be used in clinical practice until many decades later. These two major studies with Hertig and Menkin were just the beginning of the research and developments that were to come in the field of reproductive medicine for decades.

In vitro fertilization research 
Gregory Pincus began his groundbreaking research on in vitro fertilization in rabbits in the early 1930s and just a few years later, announced his success in the creation of offspring via in vitro fertilization. With IVF already being controversial, Pincus's findings resulted in negative publicity. Consequently, he was denied tenure and, ultimately, fired from his Harvard position. Although Pincus was no longer an employee of Harvard and conducting research anymore, the results of Pincus's experiment inspired John Rock to apply the findings to human conception.

John Rock hired Miriam Menkin, a research technician who assisted Gregory Pincus in the rabbit IVF experiments. They researched and experimented for 6 years until, finally, on February 6, 1944, Menkin fertilized her first egg. When a procedure to preserve the specimen was not decided on quick enough, the egg had disappeared. Not long after, Menkin fertilized 3 eggs and properly preserved them and took pictures. Rock announced their accomplishment and received some skepticism and doubt from other scientists and a notable zoologist, Carl Hartman. It was not until a baby was born in 1978, did fellow scientists, researchers, and the public attribute the first human in vitro fertilization to Rock and Menkin.

In order to help women struggling with infertility, Rock's principal objective was to develop a fetus in an artificial womb. He believed in vitro fertilization would help women all over the country who were infertile and could not have children. Rock was known for being caring, respectful and honest with his patients who so badly wanted to conceive a child. Towards the end of the 1940s, Rock received letters from a number of women across the country who wanted to try in vitro fertilization. Since there were still a multitude of questions about the process of IVF that needed to be answered and technology that needed to be developed, Rock tried to convey that IVF pregnancies were not likely.

With the likelihood of IVF pregnancies still being decades down the road, he took a step back from his IVF research and entertained alternative treatments for infertility.

Pill development and promotion
In 1951 and 1952, Margaret Sanger arranged for funding for Gregory Pincus's research of hormonal contraception. In 1952, John Rock was recruited to investigate clinical use of progesterone to prevent ovulation. In 1955, the team announced successful clinical use of progestins to prevent ovulation. Enovid, the brand name of the first pill, was approved by the U.S. Food and Drug Administration (FDA) and put on the market in 1957 as a menstrual regulator. In 1960, Enovid gained approval from the FDA for contraceptive use.

Rock was 70 years old when Enovid was approved for contraceptive use. Over the next eight years, Rock campaigned vigorously for Roman Catholic approval of the pill. He published a book, The Time Has Come: A Catholic Doctor's Proposals to End the Battle over Birth Control, and was subsequently featured in Time and Newsweek, and gave a one-hour interview to NBC. In 1958, Pope Pius XII declared that use of the pill to treat menstrual disorders was not contrary to Catholic morals. Rock believed it was only a matter of time before the Catholic Church approved its use as a contraceptive.

In 1968 the papal encyclical Humanae vitae laid out definitively the Catholic Church's opposition to hormonal and all other artificial means of contraception. Rock was profoundly disappointed.  Consequently, he withdrew from the Church that he loved so much.

Although it has been claimed by some journalists that Rock was to blame for adding "unnecessary" breaks in use of the pill (instructing one week of taking placebo sugar pills every month), Jane Dickson of the Faculty of Sexual and Reproductive Healthcare of RCOG stated in an interview that there were many more reasons for a placebo period, including as a recovery period from the then high dosage of hormones from the pill, and as reassurance that in having menstrual flow (although it was not a true period) one was not pregnant.

The Pill Trials 
The initial clinical trials were codeveloped by John Rock and were funded by Katherine McCormick, a collaborator of Margaret Sanger who dreamed for the creation of a female-controlled contraceptive method. With this funding, Gregory Pincus joined John Rock to observe contraceptive effects of progesterone on Rock's female patients.

In 1954, the two doctors began their first trials on 50 women in Massachusetts. Rock and Pincus used an oral contraceptive pill containing synthetic progesterone supplied by a pharmaceutical company, Searle. These trials occurred under what appeared to be considered a fertility study, as contraception was illegal in Massachusetts. The pill containing progesterone, was taken by women for 21 days followed by a 7-day break. Rock and Pincus wanted to give the body an opportunity for menstruation, so that this drug would not conflict with the natural biological processes in women. The concluding results revealed no ovulation occurred in any of the women during drug administration.

Rock's written scientific research explained how this drug succeeded to inhibit ovulation, but skepticism remained present in authorities. In order to provide further evidence of their developed oral contraceptive pill, Pincus and Rock moved their studies to Puerto Rico to conduct their trials on a larger scale in 1956. The pill was reported successful regarding preventative purposes but brought too many side effects for legal consideration, which was stated by the medical director of the clinical trials in Puerto Rico. While Pincus believed that only a few, mild side effects would come about, roughly half of the participants in the study dropped out due to side effects like severe headaches, nausea, and vomiting.

It was noticed after that the transportation of pills from Searle was contaminated, due to a mixture of synthetic estrogen with the progesterone. This was an obstacle for the two doctors, but their further research and testing revealed the addition of estrogen in combination with progesterone can help reduce menstrual comfort.

In 1960, the Food and Drug Administration (FDA) approved the use of the oral contraceptive, developed by Rock and Pincus. This female-controlled contraceptive method, known as the Pill, became a rapid, nationwide use for protection against pregnancy.

Later years 
In later years, Rock and Menkin would receive many letters from people about Rock's early optimism for how long it would take for IVF to be used in the clinic. Rock was said to have been filled with sadness as he had to inform women that the IVF technology would not be ready in time. He had then predicted that it would be decades before in vitro fertilization was used to successfully make women pregnant. After realizing he could no longer contribute to the IVF project, Rock decided to move on. He wanted to develop a more successful way of opening blocked Fallopian tubes, therefore his last idea before abandoning his research was the creation of artificial or plastic Fallopian tubes.

Rock retired in 1969 from his practice and moved into a farmhouse in Temple, New Hampshire. After his retirement, he founded the independent Rock Reproductive Study Center, later renamed as Rock Reproductive Clinic, Inc., in Brookline, Massachusetts. This center was known to focus on fertility, sterility, and the development of the oral contraceptives, now known as the birth control pill. He remained working at the clinic until around the late 1960s and eventually sold his practice to Dr. John H. Derry of Newton who renamed it to Derry-Rock Clinic in Roxbury, Massachusetts. He died in Peterborough, Massachusetts on December 4, 1984, at the age of 94 from myocardial infarction in Peterborough in southern New Hampshire.

References

Further reading

External links
 John C. Rock personal and professional papers, 1921-1985. H MS c161. Harvard Medical Library, Francis A. Countway Library of Medicine, Boston, Mass.

1890 births
1984 deaths
Harvard Medical School faculty
American obstetricians
American gynecologists
People from Marlborough, Massachusetts
Catholics from Massachusetts
Harvard Medical School alumni